The Ototretinae are a small subfamily in the firefly family (Lampyridae). They are close to the Luciolinae in some respects, but do not glow or flash. Rather, they attract their partners with pheromones like many relatives of the firefly family. They are found in Eurasia and North America.

They have sometimes been included in the Luciolinae: as the Ototretini, but it appears that this tribe may not be monophyletic; the puzzling Stenocladius could well be close enough to the Cyphonocerinae to be included there.

Genera
BioLib includes the following genera:
 Baolacus Pic, 1915
 Brachylampis Van Dyke, 1939
 Brachypterodrilus Pic, 1918
 Ceylanidrilus Pic, 1911
 Drilaster Kiesenwetter, 1879
 Emasia Bocakova and Janisova, 2010
 Eugeusis Westwood, 1853
 Falsophaeopterus Pic, 1911
 Flabellopalpodes Bocakova and Bocak, 2016
 Flabellototreta Pic, 1911
 Gorhamia Pic, 1911
 Harmatelia Walker, 1858
 Hydaspoides Bocakova and Janisova, 2013
 Hyperstoma Wittmer, 1979
 Lamellipalpodes Maulik, 1921
 Lamellipalpus Maulik, 1921
 Oculogryphus Jeng, Engel & Yang, 2007 (may be placed incertae sedis)
 Ototretadrilus Pic, 1921
 Picodrilus Wittmer, 1938
 Stenocladius Deyrolle & Fairmaire, 1878

References

Lampyridae